Miriam Mattinen Shearing (born Ellen Miriam Mattinen; February 24, 1935) is an American lawyer and retired judge in Nevada.  Shearing was the first woman to serve as a Nevada district judge and as justice and chief justice on the Supreme Court of Nevada (1993–2005).

Early life and education
She was born on February 24, 1935, in Waverly, New York. Shearing grew up on a farm near Spencer, New York, the oldest of three children. She was the daughter of Eino Olavi and Lillian Sophia (Petaja) Mattinen.

Her parents were Finnish American, and she spoke Finnish in the home. Shearing graduated from Cornell University with a Bachelor of Arts in philosophy; at Cornell she met her husband, Steven Shearing. She then graduated from Boston College Law School, where she took night classes while her husband attended medical school.

Career
After graduation, the Shearings moved to California, where Steven Shearing completed his medical internship and residency, and then lived in Pakistan, where Steven Shearing worked for CARE. The Shearings moved to Nevada in 1969, and Shearing was admitted to the bar in Nevada that year, becoming the fiftieth woman admitted to practice in the state. Shearing practiced for several years in Las Vegas, and became a juvenile court referee in 1975.  Shearing successfully ran for a seat on the justice court, after the Clark County Commission (which was opposed to a woman serving on the court) refused to appoint her to an open seat.

In 1977, Shearing became a justice of the peace in Clark County. In 1983, Shearing became a Nevada District Court judge, the first woman to do so In 1986, Shearing became chief judge on the court and served as president of the Nevada District Judges Association.

In 1992, Shearing won an election to the Nevada Supreme Court, defeating District Judge J. Charles Thompson, the one-time favorite, 43 percent to 29 percent. Shearing was an advocate of abortion rights who during the election campaign urged "a female voice" on the court. The election was deeply bitter in tone, which the Nevada Commission on Judicial Discipline criticized, prompting Shearing and Thompson to apologize and agree "to refrain from negative campaigning in the future." Shearing became the first woman on the Nevada Supreme Court, and the 40th serving female state supreme court justice.

Shearing served on the court for twelve years, and was named chief justice in 1997. She ran unopposed for reelection in 1998. Shearing announced in April 2003 that she would not seek a third term, and retired on January 4, 2005, at the conclusion of her second term in office.

Shearing said that upon retirement she would divide her time between Las Vegas and Incline Village.

Personal life
Shearing was married to husband Dr. Steven Shearing (d. 2011), an ophthalmologist and pioneer in cataract surgery. They had three children.

In February 1984, the Shearings were part of a group of landowners who donated 1,470 acres of land near Pioche, Nevada, to the University of Nevada, Las Vegas. Valued at $882,000, the donation was at that time one of the largest gifts in UNLV history.

See also
List of female state supreme court justices
List of first women lawyers and judges in Nevada

References

Nevada Supreme Court bio

1935 births
Living people
American people of Finnish descent
Boston College Law School alumni
Cornell University alumni
Nevada state court judges
Justices of the Nevada Supreme Court
People from Tioga County, New York
People from Incline Village, Nevada
Women chief justices of state supreme courts in the United States
Chief Justices of the Nevada Supreme Court
21st-century American lawyers
20th-century American lawyers
20th-century American judges
21st-century American judges
Nevada lawyers
New York (state) lawyers
20th-century American women judges
21st-century American women judges